The Brood of Erys is a Big Finish Productions audio drama based on the long-running British science fiction television series Doctor Who.

Plot 
The Doctor materialises the TARDIS on Erys, the moon of the planet Asphya, where it is raided by the imp-like Drachee, and his companion Flip is kidnapped.

Cast 
The Doctor – Colin Baker
Flip Jackson – Lisa Greenwood
Sarra Vanser/Female Drachee – Nicola Sian
Lona – Tori Hart
Terrill/Levek – Chris Overton
Renval/Erys – Brian Shelley
Elgin Vanser – Glynn Sweet

References

External links 
The Brood of Erys at bigfinish.com

2014 audio plays
Sixth Doctor audio plays